The Paso Real Formation is a geologic formation in Puntarenas Province, Costa Rica. The sandstones and conglomerates preserve vertebrate fossils dating back to the Late Pliocene to Early Pleistocene period.

Fossil content 
The following fossils have been found in the formation:

 Rhynchotherium blicki
 Crocodylus sp.
 Equus sp.
 Eremotherium sp.
 Holmesina sp.
 Pampatherium sp.
 Camelidae indet.
 Gomphotheriidae indet.
 Testudines indet.

See also 

 List of fossiliferous stratigraphic units in Costa Rica

References

Bibliography 
 
 

Geologic formations of Costa Rica
Neogene Costa Rica
Pleistocene Costa Rica
Sandstone formations
Conglomerate formations
Fluvial deposits
Paleontology in Costa Rica
Formations